Word of Mouth is a peer-reviewed academic journal that publishes papers five times a year in the field of education. The editor-in-chief is Carol Westby (University of New Mexico). The journal was established in 1989 and is currently published by SAGE Publications in association with The Hammill Institute on Disabilities.

Abstracting and indexing 
Word of Mouth is abstracted and indexed in CINAHL and Scopus.

External links 
 
 Hammill Institute on Disabilities

SAGE Publishing academic journals
English-language journals
Education journals
Publications established in 1989
5 times per year journals